West Trenton Line may refer to the following commuter rail lines:

West Trenton Line, formerly known as the R3, running between Ewing, New Jersey and Philadelphia, Pennsylvania
West Trenton Line (NJ Transit), a proposed line between Ewing and Bridgewater, New Jersey

See also
Trenton Line (disambiguation)